"Birds Fly (Whisper to a Scream)", given the reversed title "Whisper to a Scream (Birds Fly)" in some markets, is a song by the British band the Icicle Works. It was released in 1983 as the first single from the band's 1984 debut eponymous album The Icicle Works. The song was written by Ian McNabb, the band's lead singer, and produced by Hugh Jones.

UK releases
The recording was initially released as a single in the UK in June 1983 as "Birds Fly (Whisper to a Scream)" on the Situation Two label. This initial release hit #2 on the UK independent charts, and scraped the lower reaches of the UK singles chart at #89.

After the Icicle Works' next UK single "Love Is a Wonderful Colour" hit #15 on the UK charts in late 1983 and early 1984, Beggars Banquet Records rereleased "Birds Fly (Whisper to a Scream)" in March 1984 with a new cover and B-side. This release climbed to #52 in the UK.

American release
The group's American label Arista Records refused to release the record unless some changes were made. The track was remixed slightly in order to remove a brief spoken-word overdub in the opening bars of music (the woman performing this intro was identified only as "Mariella" on the original Situation Two single sleeve). As well, the song title was reversed, becoming "Whisper to a Scream (Birds Fly)" and Arista shortened the band's name to Icicle Works. With changes, the song reached #37 on the U.S. Billboard Hot 100 chart, and #34 on Cashbox's singles chart in the summer of 1984. The song also reached #18 on the Billboard Mainstream Rock chart, #13 on Billboard's dance chart and #15 on the Radio & Records AOR chart.

Canadian release
The Canadian version of the single (credited to The Icicle Works) used the original UK mix with the spoken-word intro, but under the revised American title "Whisper to a Scream (Birds Fly)." This was the most successful commercial release of the single, reaching #19 on the Canadian chart in the summer of 1984.

Track listings
1983 release
7" vinyl
 "Birds Fly (Whisper to a Scream)" (3:46)
 "Reverie Girl" (3:54)

12" vinyl
 "Birds Fly (Whisper to a Scream)" (3:52)
 "Reverie Girl" (3:55)
 "Gunboys" (3:44)

1984 release
7" vinyl [UK]
 "Birds Fly (Whisper to a Scream)" (3:48)
 "In the Cauldron of Love" (3:50)
7" vinyl [Canada]
 "Birds Fly (Whisper to a Scream)" (3:48)
 "Scarecrow" (3:06)
12" vinyl (BEG 108T)
 "Birds Fly (Whisper to a Scream)" (3:48)
 "In the Cauldron of Love" (3:50)
 "Scarecrow" (3:06)
 "Ragweed Campaign" (4:12)
12" vinyl (BEG 108TD)
 "Birds Fly (Whisper to a Scream)" (3:48)
 "In the Cauldron of Love" (3:50)
 "Birds Fly (Frantic Mix)" (5.20)
12" vinyl (BEG 108TR)
 "Birds Fly (Frantic Mix)" (5:20)
 "Birds Fly (Whisper to a Scream)" (3:48)
 "In the Cauldron of Love" (3:50)
 "Scarecrow" (3:06)
 "Ragweed Campaign" (4:10)

Covers and use in media
 The band Acumen Nation covered the song under the title "Whisper to a Scream" on the 1997 cover compilation Newer Wave and again on their single for the song "Unkind".
 A cover of the song by Soho was used in the 1996 film Scream.
 The song was covered in 2004 by Edmonton-based band Social Code on A Year at the Movies.
 The popular Canadian teen drama Degrassi: The Next Generation, which is known for naming each episode after a hit 1980s song, named an episode after this song. The episode faced the issue of self-mutilation.
 In Saints Row: The Third, the song is part of the playlist for the in-game radio station 107.77 The Mix FM.
 An episode of Grey's Anatomy, another show that uses song titles for episode titles, was titled after the song.
 The song was used in the opening sequence for episodes in the second season of Halt and Catch Fire.
 The melody of the song was adapted for use in a series of Budweiser commercials.
 The song was used during the end credits of Episode 7 of Season 2 of the show Stranger Things.

References

External links
 Ian McNabb website

1983 singles
1984 singles
The Icicle Works songs
1983 songs
Beggars Banquet Records singles
Song recordings produced by Hugh Jones (producer)